Roshika Deo is a Fijian feminist and activist. She is the founder of the Be The Change Campaign/Movement in Fiji, which is a movement endorsing feminism, LGBTQI, disability rights, human rights, and environmentalism. The mission of her organisation is to transform Fiji's social, political, economic, and cultural landscape.

Career 

In 2009 Deo became the youngest person in the Pacific region to have received the Paul Harris Fellowship Award, which she was given in recognition of her enthusiasm and commitment to helping her community. She was nominated for the Amnesty International Human Rights Defender award in 2013. She also received US Secretary of State International Women of Courage Award from Michelle Obama in 2014, once again the youngest Pacific recipient to date. 

Roshika Deo was a candidate in the general elections in September 2014 and ran as an independent. She campaigned alone during the election and declined assistance from well-known parties because they lacked a clear stance on her main rights-based issues. Deo fell short of the votes needed by a large margin receiving 1055 out of the 248,183 votes needed to win. 

After the election, she started working to create the planned Be The Change Party in order to transform her commitment to LGBTQI, women's, and human rights into a platform for political engagement and to give young people in Fiji a voice. 

Deo's career as a female politician in Fiji has garnered international interest. During the 2016 DLP Annual Conference, Priya Chattier, Research Fellow in Gender at the Australian National University's State, Society, and Governance in Melanesia Program, discussed "Power, Politics, and Positive Deviance," which included a presentation on Deo's experience.

She is also known for her advocacy and work in the area of women's rights and ending violence against girls and women.

Personal life 
Roshika Deo belongs to an Indo-Fijian Hindu family. Her father Indar Deo was a councillor, a politician for the National Alliance Party, and a businessman, who now lives in Australia. 

Deo attended Suva Grammar School and holds a Bachelor of Laws from the University of the South Pacific (USP).

See also 
 Indians in Fiji

References

1981 births
Living people
Fijian environmentalists
Fijian Hindus
Recipients of the International Women of Courage Award